"For Your Entertainment" is the debut mainstream single by American  recording artist and American Idol season eight runner-up Adam Lambert.
It is also the title track to his debut studio album, For Your Entertainment. The song was released commercially on November 3, 2009, and was written by Claude Kelly and Dr. Luke. It was a top 10 hit in Finland, Japan, New Zealand and the US dance club chart.

Lambert's performance of the song at the 2009 American Music Awards prompted complaints from the Parents Television Council and ABC canceled Lambert's scheduled performance on Good Morning America. A remixed version of the song was added to the set list of Lambert's first concert tour, the 2010 Glam Nation Tour as the show's opening. The actual song was only performed on the Asian and Australian legs of the tour right after the song "Voodoo".

Background
On October 28, 2009, Lambert announced via Twitter that his lead single from his debut album would be "For Your Entertainment", a song that was produced by Dr. Luke. The following day, Lambert announced that the single would debut on Ryan Seacrest's radio show on October 30, 2009.

The song became available as a legal download in the United States on November 3, 2009, and on November 15, 2009, in the United Kingdom.

Critical reception
The song was well received by music critics. The Huffington Post noted that this song is a "full-display" of album that "operates from a disco/glam aesthetic of escapism and liberation via dance, dress-up, and desire" and added that it "fully accomplish what the singer had in mind for the album: songs that make you want to let loose, dance, work out, have fun." Allmusic called this song "cool" and "strutting" and marked it as one of highlights of album. Entertainment Weekly opined that "peacocking title track" "follows duly fulfills its pledge (Entertained? Synth-ertained!)". Detroit News called this song "pulsating" and praised the vocals "[singer is] somehow cramming every musical note into one banshee wail."

Chicago Tribune wrote that song "promises to get rough with you". Boston editor Sarah Rodman noted that this "less-than-compelling wink-wink, Britney-evoking throb-pop" track doesn't have enough time to adjust itself from opening track. Rolling Stone wasn't very positive by calling it "less successful" and comparing it: "similar to Sam Sparro's "Black and Gold" that 19 Entertainment should probably keep a strong legal team on retainer."

Music video
The music video premiered on Lambert's official website on November 24, 2009. It was directed by Ray Kay. The video was filmed in a one-day shoot, on November 15 at The Alexandria, an old hotel which is now an apartment building in downtown Los Angeles.

The video opens with a nighttime street level shot in a city. As the camera pans down below the ground, Lambert is shown walking into an underground club, filled with scantily clad men and women. As he begins singing, he walks through the crowd and interacts and dances with others. Mixed with dancing are close up shots of Lambert and various dancers. Towards the end of the song, Lambert begins to play with his band and the video shows everyone in the club dancing. As the song ends, the camera pans back up to the street level where life is continuing on, completely oblivious of what is going on below the streets.

Performances
"For Your Entertainment" made its live debut at the American Music Awards on November 22, 2009, at the Nokia Theatre in Los Angeles, California, which aired on ABC. The performance caused controversy due to Lambert acting too provocative on stage by aggressively grinding on his male dancers and making out with his keyboardist. The Parents Television Council slammed the performance as being sexualized, and urged viewers to complain to the FCC if living in an area where the performance was shown before 10 p.m. local time. However, Lambert's performance reportedly was broadcast around 11 p.m. Eastern and Pacific time, "outside the FCC's usual 6am-10pm time frame". The performance drew 1,500 complaints to ABC, many of which probably came from the PTC. As a result, ABC announced that Lambert would not be performing on Good Morning America on November 25 as planned. CBS subsequently invited Lambert to perform instead on The Early Show on the same date in New York City.

Lambert told Rolling Stone magazine, "Female performers have been doing this for years — pushing the envelope about sexuality — and the minute a man does it, everybody freaks out. We're in 2009 — it's time to take risks, be a little more brave, time to open people's eyes and if it offends them, then maybe I'm not for them. My goal was not to piss people off, it was to promote freedom of expression and artistic freedom."

Lambert then went on a series of promotional interviews and performances to address the controversy, clear up rumors, discuss his rapid rise to fame, and promote the album. He was interviewed on The Ellen DeGeneres Show, The View, and The Oprah Winfrey Show. Lambert has performed the song during We Are Glamily Tour and The Original High Tour.

Chart performance
"For Your Entertainment" debuted at number 84 on the U.S. Billboard Hot 100 for the chart week of November 28, 2009. That same week, the song also debuted at number 33 on the Canadian Hot 100. In March, the song was also featured as a VIP Track on the UK's 4Music, prior to the album's upcoming release the end of April. To date, the song has been the most successful in Canada and New Zealand, where it achieved Platinum and Gold status respectively (see below). The song has sold approximately 333,000 digital downloads.

"For Your Entertainment" entered the UK Singles Chart on May 2, 2010, at number 39. In its second week in the chart, the single remained at number 39; in its third week, it climbed two more places to its peak, number 37.

Use in popular culture
Starting December 22, Fox began using "For Your Entertainment" as the official song highlighting their January television show line-up. E! Network in February 2010 aired a commercial promoting their television line-up with a remix of "For Your Entertainment".
It was also featured in an advertisement for 4music in the United Kingdom in 2010.
In addition, the BBC used it in a montage of the 'best and worst of the crucible 2010'.

Track listing
Digital download
"For Your Entertainment" – 3:35

Remixes (Part of Remixes album)
 "For Your Entertainment" (Bimbo Jones Vocal Mix) - 6:29
 "For Your Entertainment" (Brad Walsh Remix) - 4:56

Charts

Weekly charts

Year-end charts

Certifications

Release history

References

2009 singles
Adam Lambert songs
Music videos directed by Ray Kay
Songs written by Dr. Luke
Song recordings produced by Dr. Luke
2009 songs
Songs written by Claude Kelly
RCA Records singles
Television controversies in the United States
LGBT-related controversies in music
Obscenity controversies in music

fr:For Your Entertainment